"Don't Get Around Much Anymore" is a jazz standard written by composer Duke Ellington. The song was originally entitled "Never No Lament" and was first recorded by Duke Ellington and his orchestra on May 4, 1940. "Don't Get Around Much Anymore" quickly became a hit after Bob Russell wrote its lyrics in 1942.

Two different recordings of "Don't Get Around Much Anymore", one by The Ink Spots and the 1940 instrumental by Ellington's own band, reached No. 1 on the R&B chart in the US in 1943. Both were top-ten pop records, along with a version by Glen Gray. The Duke Ellington version reached No. 8 on the pop chart.

Other versions
 Mose Allison – Young Man Mose, Prestige, 1958)
 Mose Allison – Creek Bank (Prestige, 1975)
 Louis Armstrong with his All-Stars and Duke Ellington – The Great Reunion (1961) and included on The Great Summit
 Louis Armstrong – I've Got the World on a String (1960)
 Tony Bennett and Miguel Bosé – Viva Duets (2010)
 Tony Bennett and Michael Bublé – Duets II (2011)
 Tony Bennett (solo version) – Tony Makes It Happen (1967)
 Michael Bublé – BaBalu (1996), Higher (2022)
 Joan Cartwright with Lonnie Smith – In Pursuit of a Melody (1991)
 Chicago – Night & Day Big Band (1995)
 June Christy – Ballads for Night People and  Spotlight on June Christy (1995)
 The Coasters – One by One (1960)
 Nat King Cole – Just One of Those Things (1957)
 Natalie Cole –  Unforgettable... with Love (1991)
 Harry Connick Jr. – When Harry Met Sally... (1989)
 Sam Cooke – My Kind of Blues (1961)
 Hank Crawford – Dig These Blues (Atlantic, 1965)
 Bing Crosby – recorded on April 15, 1977, and included on the album A Tribute to Duke 
 Bill Doggett – A Salute to Ellington (King, 1957)
 Dr. John with Ronnie Cuber – Duke Elegant (1999)
 Ella Fitzgerald – Ella Fitzgerald Sings the Duke Ellington Songbook (Verve, 1957)
 Eydie Gormé – Eydie Swings the Blues (1957)
 Glen Gray and the Casa Loma Orchestra (vocals by Kenny Sargent and LeBrun Sisters) – recorded July 27, 1942 for Decca. This reached No. 7 in the pop chart. (1943)
 Earl Holliman – Capitol (1958)
 Tab Hunter on Dot. The B-side to "Ninety-Nine Ways", which was a No. 11 hit in March 1957. "Don't Get Around Much Anymore" itself charted at No. 74 in March 1957.
 The Ink Spots reached No. 1 on the R&B chart for two non-consecutive weeks and No. 2 on the pop chart (1943)
 Mark Isham & Kate Ceberano – Bittersweet (2009)
 Etta James – The Second Time Around (Argo, 1961)
 Harry James with Buddy Rich – Live! (Sunbeam, 1979)
 B.B. King with the Maxwell Davis Orchestra – Compositions of Duke Ellington and Others (1960)
 B.B. King with Duke Ellington Orchestra – King of the Blues (1992)
 Grace Knight – Come in Spinner, ABC TV (Australia) (1990)
 Paul McCartney –  B-side to Once Upon A Long Ago (1987), and Снова в СССР (1987)
 Anne Murray – I'll Be Seeing You (2004)
 Anna Nalick - The Blackest Crow (2019)
 Willie Nelson – Stardust (1978)
 Patti Page – Music for Two in Love (1956)
 The Radars – (Zodiac, 1967)
 Cliff Richard – Bold as Brass (2010)
 Rod Stewart – As Time Goes By: the Great American Songbook 2 (2003)
 Mel Tormé – The Duke Ellington and Count Basie Songbooks (Verve, 1961)
 Ed Townsend – Glad to Be Here (1959)
 Brooks Williams – Blues and Ballads'' (2006)

References

External links
"Don't Get Around Much Anymore" Arrangement for guitar

1940 songs
1943 singles
1940s jazz standards
Songs with lyrics by Bob Russell (songwriter)
Songs with music by Duke Ellington
Duke Ellington songs
The Ink Spots songs
Swing jazz standards